Sa Thầy is a rural district of Kon Tum province in the Central Highlands region of Vietnam. It is a very mountainous district, with many hydroelectric dam projects located along the major rivers. The district has one of the lowest population densities in Vietnam. As of 2003 the district had a population of 29,605. The district capital lies at Sa Thầy.

See also
Lung Leng

References

Districts of Kon Tum province